Perfect Cut is a Singaporean Chinese drama series which aired on MediaCorp Channel U. The second season debuted on 4 March 2009 in the weekday 10:00pm slot. It features former MediaCorp artistes such as Edmund Chen and Zheng Wanling in main roles.

Cast

Season 2

Guest cast
Season 1

Season 2

Synopsis
Alex Tan is a well-regarded plastic surgeon known as "the doctor with a soul". The story centers on his patients and the people he meets in his clinic.

Awards & Nominations

References

External links
Official Website
Perfect Cut (English) on MediaCorp website

Singapore Chinese dramas
2008 Singaporean television series debuts
Channel U (Singapore) original programming